Mahakali Lake is a high altitude lake which lies between Sano and Gudial villages of Chamba district in Himachal Pradesh, India. This lake remains frozen for 6 months from November to April.

History 
Lake is considered sacred to Goddess Mahakali. 
Nearby Ghadhasaru Lake  has a small temple of Goddess Kali.

References

External links
Himachal Pradesh Tourism Department

Lakes of Himachal Pradesh
Geography of Chamba district
Sacred lakes of India